Major general Gholam Ali Rashid is the commander of Khatam-al Anbiya Central Headquarter and former deputy chief of the General Staff of Armed Forces of the Islamic Republic of Iran who was among decision-making commanders in the Iran–Iraq War. Also, Gholam Ali along with Mohammad Ali Ja'fari, Ali Fadavi, Qasem Soleymani, and Mohammad Bagheri is member of command network in the Armed Forces of the Islamic Republic of Iran.

In the news 
Gholam Ali Rashid declared that Iran may attack Israel military equipment and nuclear sites in a military war.

In a conference in Tehran, he announced that Iranian commanders are in Iraq, Syria, Palestine, and Lebanon to give military advice.

Gholam Ali Rashid stated: "the nuclear issue and human rights are merely pretexts". Also he mentioned "stressing that those raising such issues against Iran actually have problems with Islam."

He said that any military action against Iran by the United States would be a strategic mistake.

See also 
 List of Iranian two-star generals since 1979
 List of Iranian commanders in the Iran–Iraq War

References

External links 
 Photo of Gholam Ali Rashid in the Iran-Iraq war

Living people
Islamic Revolutionary Guard Corps personnel of the Iran–Iraq War
Islamic Revolutionary Guard Corps major generals
Mojahedin of the Islamic Revolution Organization politicians
1953 births
Iranian individuals subject to the U.S. Department of the Treasury sanctions